Jean-Paul Vinay (18 July 1910 – 10 April 1999) was a French-Canadian linguist. He is considered one of the pioneers in translation studies, along with Jean Darbelnet, with whom Vinay co-authored Stylistique comparée du français et de l'anglais (1958), a seminal work in the field.

Life and career
Vinay was born in Paris in 1910 and soon moved to Le Havre. He studied English and philology at the University of Caen and at the University of Paris before receiving an M.A. in phonetics and philology from University College, London, in 1937. In 1946, Vinay moved to Canada and became professor and head of the Department of Linguistics and Translation at the Université de Montréal. In 1967, he began teaching at the University of Victoria, until his retirement in 1976. He died in Victoria, British Columbia, in 1999.

References

French translation scholars
Canadian translation scholars
Linguists from France
Academic staff of the Université de Montréal
Academic staff of the University of Victoria
Alumni of University College London
1910 births
1999 deaths
20th-century linguists
French emigrants to Canada